Grim's Ditch is the name of several bank and ditch earthworks in southern England, including:
Grim's Ditch (Chilterns), a series of earthworks in the Chiltern Hills
Grim's Ditch (Harrow), an area in the London Borough of Harrow

See also
Grim's Dyke